James Hoste (1633–1699), of Wood Hall, Sandringham, Norfolk, was an English politician.

He was a Member (MP) of the Parliament of England for Castle Rising in March 1679, October 1679 and 1681.

References

1633 births
1699 deaths
English MPs 1679
People from Sandringham, Norfolk
English MPs 1681